Risa Lauren Goluboff is an American lawyer and legal historian who serves as the 12th dean of the University of Virginia School of Law; she is the first woman to hold the position. She is also the Arnold H. Leon Professor of Law and a professor of history at the University of Virginia.

Background
Goluboff studied History and Sociology as an undergraduate at Harvard University before attending Yale Law School, where she graduated in 2000. She also received a Doctor of Philosophy in History from Princeton University.

Career

From 2000 to 2001, she clerked for Judge Guido Calabresi of the United States Court of Appeals for the Second Circuit. From 2001 to 2002, she was clerk for Justice Stephen Breyer of the Supreme Court of the United States. She served as a Fulbright Scholar to South Africa.

In 2009, she won a Guggenheim fellowship.

On November 20, 2015, she was selected to be the dean of the University of Virginia School of Law, and took office July 1, 2016.

Works
 
 Preview.
Editor 

Journal articles
  Pdf.
 
 

PhD Thesis

See also 
 List of law clerks of the Supreme Court of the United States (Seat 2)

References

External links
 Articles by Risa Goluboff at Slate

Living people
20th-century American women lawyers
20th-century American lawyers
21st-century American women lawyers
21st-century American lawyers
Year of birth missing (living people)
American legal scholars
American legal writers
American scholars of constitutional law
Harvard College alumni
Jewish American attorneys
Jewish American writers
Law clerks of the Supreme Court of the United States
Princeton University alumni
Slate (magazine) people
University of Virginia School of Law faculty
Yale Law School alumni